Marcelo Fabián Méndez Russo (born 10 January 1981) is a Uruguayan football manager and former player who played as a centre back. He is the current manager of Defensor Sporting.

Biography
In September 2006, he signed a 2-year contract with Kayserispor. He was released in August 2007.

In February 2010 he was signed by Astra.

References

External links
 
 
 
 

Uruguayan footballers
Uruguayan football managers
Centro Atlético Fénix players
Atlético Junior footballers
Club Atlético Independiente footballers
Kayserispor footballers
Peñarol players
Montevideo Wanderers F.C. players
FC Astra Giurgiu players
Independiente Rivadavia footballers
Argentine Primera División players
Süper Lig players
Liga I players
Association football central defenders
Uruguayan expatriate footballers
Expatriate footballers in Argentina
Expatriate footballers in Turkey
Expatriate footballers in Romania
Uruguayan expatriate sportspeople in Argentina
Uruguayan expatriate sportspeople in Turkey
Uruguayan expatriate sportspeople in Romania
Footballers from Montevideo
1981 births
Living people
Association football defenders
C.A. Progreso managers
Danubio F.C. managers
Defensor Sporting managers
Uruguayan expatriate football managers
Uruguayan expatriate sportspeople in Mexico
Expatriate football managers in Mexico